Runting-stunting syndrome in broilers is a syndrome described in broilers since the 1940s, but often with specific etiological appellations (viral enteritis, malabsorption syndrome, brittle bone disease, infectious proventriculitis, helicopter disease and pale bird syndrome). It consists of stunted growth in birds, which is clearly visible in the second month of growth (30–42 days).

Symptoms 
The mortality of the flock is unaffected, but a certain proportion of birds (1 to 10 percent) show decreased body weights ("runts") and elevated feed conversion. This leads to reduced uniformity of the flock.

Aetiology 
Causing agents may include:
 viruses: reovirus (often considered as unique cause), adenoviruses, enteroviruses, rotaviruses, parvoviruses. 
 bacteria like Escherichia coli, Proteus mirabilis, Enterococcus faecium, Staphylococcus cohnii, Clostridium perfringens, Bacteroides fragilis and Bacillus licheniformis, often isolated in affected birds.

Control 
Reovirus vaccines are advocated (in dams or in broilers) but do not entirely solve the problem.

General hygiene and correct breeding conditions (especially correct brooding temperatures) may be efficient, but the disease often disappears as it had appeared, which makes it difficult to appreciate the effectiveness of control measures.

References 

Poultry diseases
Syndromes in birds